George Herbert Ingalls Cockburn (April 14, 1889 – April 21, 1957) was a Canadian politician in the Province of New Brunswick. He was born in St. Andrews, New Brunswick, the son of  Melville N. Cockburn and Katie Shaw. He was elected to the Legislative Assembly in the 1930 New Brunswick general election as a Progressive Conservative Party candidate in the multi-member riding of Charlotte County.

1889 births
1957 deaths
Progressive Conservative Party of New Brunswick MLAs
People from Charlotte County, New Brunswick